50 manat - is a denomination of banknotes used in Azerbaijan and Turkmenistan.

Features of banknotes

Banknotes in circulation

See also 

Azerbaijani manat
Turkmenistani manat

References 

Currencies of Azerbaijan
Currencies of Turkmenistan
Fifty-base-unit banknotes